"Burning Love" is a 1972 song by Elvis Presley written by Dennis Linde, originally released by Arthur Alexander earlier in 1972. Elvis Presley had a major hit with the song, becoming his biggest hit single in the United States since "Suspicious Minds" in 1969 and his last Top 10 hit in the American Hot 100 or pop charts.

Elvis Presley version
Elvis Presley's  version was released as a single on August 1, 1972, with the B-side "It's a Matter of Time", and it reached the Top 40 on the country charts, peaking at #36. Elvis had recorded it at RCA's Hollywood studios on March 28, 1972. It was his last big hit. The electric guitar opening and riffs were overdubbed and played by Dennis Linde himself.

For the week of October 28, 1972, "Burning Love" rose to #2 on the Billboard Hot 100, kept from #1 by Chuck Berry's novelty song "My Ding-a-Ling." However, it reached #1 on Cashbox's Top 40 Charts for the week of November 11, which gave him 20 US #1 hits. The song was Elvis's 40th and last Top Ten hit on the Billboard US charts. "Steamroller Blues" in 1973 was his last one on the Cashbox Charts, peaking at #10, in the wake of the massively successful Aloha Concert. It was also one of the last real rock songs in the last years of his life; from 1972 to 1977 the majority of his songs were ballads, and many of those placed on Billboard's Hot Country Singles chart. "Burning Love" was one of the few exceptions, along with "Promised Land" in 1974.

He performed it in at least two high-profile productions: the concert film Elvis on Tour (during which he had to use a lyric sheet as the song was still new to him), and the later Aloha from Hawaii concert. The song was also performed during the afternoon and evening shows in Lakeland on April 27, 1975, and during the Asheville evening show on July 22 the same year; although it remained a rare song in the list performed by Elvis from 1972 onwards.

The song was also released on an album titled Burning Love and Hits from His Movies, Volume 2 on November 1, 1972. Despite this album's subtitle, none of the movie songs on it were ever hits. The only actual hit on the album was the title song, "Burning Love".

The newly recorded backing track for the song was recorded in 1980 and was intended for the Guitar Man album. but it was unreleased until 2000.

Personnel
 Elvis Presley — lead vocals
 James Burton, Dennis Linde — guitar
 John Wilkinson — rhythm guitar
 Emory Gordy Jr. — bass
 Glen D. Hardin — piano
 Ronnie Tutt — drums
 J. D. Sumner & The Stamps — backing vocals
 Jerry Carrigan – percussion, cowbell

1980 version
 Elvis Presley — lead vocals
 Jerry Shook — guitar
 Larry Byrom — electric guitar
 Mike Leech — bass
 Larrie Londin — drums
 David Briggs — piano

Charts

Weekly charts

Year-end charts

Certifications

Uses

 The song was recorded for the 1979 film, Elvis The Movie, starring Kurt Russell and Ronnie McDowell as the singing voice of Elvis. The song was not released for a soundtrack.
 Wynonna Judd's version of "Burning Love" is the closing song of Lilo & Stitch (2002). The song itself would later play a role in an episode of Lilo & Stitch: The Series, with main character Lilo Pelekai naming a hummingbird-like love-inducing experiment, "Hunkahunka".
 The song was used during the Miss Universe 2010 swimsuit competition, where Ximena Navarrete from México won the title.
 A remix was used for the Cirque du Soleil show Viva Elvis, which began in 2010, and found on its soundtrack. During the live show, it is played during a montage of Elvis's best love scenes on the rear-projection screen, while the band has a spotlight. This remix puts more emphasis on drums and guitars, with a sound similar to The Who.
 The song was used in the 2011 video game Homefront in the mission "Night Raid" where members of the American Resistance launch white phosphorus on soldiers of the Korean People's Army.
 The song is one of six possible soundtracks on the Disney California Adventure attraction Guardians of the Galaxy – Mission: Breakout!, which opened in 2017.
 "Burning Love" was used as a wake-up song on the space shuttle mission STS-123.
 The song was frequently used by comedian Conan O'Brien to warm up his audience prior to taping his talk show Late Night with Conan O'Brien, with the host singing the lyrics with musical accompaniment by the house band.
 Various films and television series have included performances of and references to the song, including The Golden Girls (1988), The Simpsons (2001), The Game Plan, Crazy Love (2007), Ghosts of Girlfriends Past (2009), The Newsroom, New Girl, The Mistle-Tones (2012), Planes: Fire & Rescue (2014), Fuller House (2016), Avengers: Infinity War, Zombieland: Double Tap (2019).
 Presley's recording was used in Baz Luhrmann's 2022 Presley biopic Elvis, and is featured on its soundtrack.

References

American songs
1972 singles
Elvis Presley songs
Melissa Etheridge songs
Wynonna Judd songs
Gene Summers songs
Travis Tritt songs
Cashbox number-one singles
Songs written by Dennis Linde
RCA Records singles
Arthur Alexander songs